Joana Zimmer (born ; Freiburg im Breisgau, West Germany) is a German pop music singer, often compared to Celine Dion or Barry Manilow. Zimmer is blind.

Discography

Albums

Singles

External links

 Joana Zimmer, official site (in German)

1982 births
Living people
Blind musicians
English-language singers from Germany
German women pop singers
21st-century German women singers